Michael Holt (born 7 August 1978) is an English former professional snooker player from Nottingham. A former world Top 20 player, he has won one ranking event – the 2020 Snooker Shoot Out – and two minor-ranking tournaments. He has been runner-up at two ranking events – the 2016 Riga Masters and the 2019 Snooker Shoot Out. He also reached the semi-finals of the 2013 Shanghai Masters as well as five further quarter-finals.

Career

2001–2010
Holt lost in the final qualifying round of the World Snooker Championship in 2001 and 2002. Holt almost qualified for the 2004 event – he was 9–5 ahead in his final qualifying match against Anthony Hamilton, before losing the next five frames to lose the match.

In the 2005 World Snooker Championship, he beat his friend Paul Hunter in the first round. In the second round he faced Steve Davis, losing 10–13 after having led 8–2. For the 2005 tournament he used eBay to auction the sponsorship space on his waistcoat to Cabaret, a Nottingham nightspot.

He qualified for the 2006 World Championship, and lost in the first round to eventual runner-up Peter Ebdon 10–8, earning Ebdon's applause as a result of his performance. 
He won the non-ranking German Open in 2006, and reached the final in 2005. His 5–3 victory over Ronnie O'Sullivan in the 2007 Malta Cup was his first in five attempts against O'Sullivan. He then lost to Mark King in the last 16 there. He lost to eventual champion John Higgins in the first round in 2007. The rest of 2007 was unspectacular, barring victory in the minor Dutch Open, which featured seven of the top 32 of the time, including wins over Nigel Bond and Barry Pinches. He missed out on the 2008 World Championship after losing to Michael Judge, causing him to drop out of the top 32 after four seasons there, after a season in which he failed to reach the last 16 of a ranking event.

Holt's results improved in 2008–09. He reached the last 16 of the 2008 Grand Prix, defeating Jimmy White and Michael Judge to qualify and scored a 5–1 defeat of Mark Allen at the venue, before losing 2–5 to Ding Junhui. In the subsequent Bahrain Championship Holt scored a 5–0 victory over David Morris in which his Irish opponent scored just 10 points, the lowest total in a best-of-nine world ranking match since 1992. He then beat Jamie Cope to reach the last sixteen and commented that he was in the best form of his career. He then lost 4–5 to Robert Milkins in the last 16, having led 3–0. He defeated Mark Davis and Dominic Dale to reach the 2009 World Championship, guaranteeing his return to the top 32. He summarised the change in his game by commenting "This year, people have had to beat me. I haven't given matches away."

Holt qualified for three of the six ranking tournaments in the 2009–10 season, but lost in the first round in each.

2010–11 season
The 2010–11 season saw the introduction of Players Tour Championship (PTC) events. At the Prague Classic, Holt won six matches to reach the first final of the career which included victories over Stephen Maguire, Mark Selby and Shaun Murphy. He faced John Higgins who he had failed to beat in 13 previous meetings, but produced a superb performance to win 4–2. Holt dedicated the title to his father who had suffered a stroke two months previously. The result ensured he would qualify for the PTC Finals as he finished 13th on the Order of Merit and he saw off Marco Fu 4–1 and Barry Pinches 4–3 to match his best result in a full ranking event. In the quarter-finals he lost 4–2 against Martin Gould. Despite his late season surge in form he ended it ranked world number 45, the lowest he had been in ten years.

2011–12 season
Holt reached the second round of ranking events three times during the 2011–12 season, but lost on each occasion. He saved his best performances for the minor-ranking PTC events for the second season in a row most notably at the 10th event where he won the title by beating Dominic Dale 4–2 in the final. Holt said afterwards that the shorter matches suit him as there is not enough time for him to lose his head and stated that if he could maintain a consistent temperament he could achieve more success in the game. He was also a losing quarter-finalist in three other events to finish fourth on the Order of Merit and qualify for the Finals again where he was beaten 4–1 by Stephen Lee.

2012–13 season
Holt qualified for four of the first six ranking events in the 2012–13 season, but could not advance beyond the first round in any of them. At the German Masters he beat Mark Williams 5–1 and Kurt Maflin 5–3 to reach the quarter-finals where he lost 5–2 to Ali Carter.

2013–14 season
At the 2013 Shanghai Masters, Holt reached the semi-finals of a ranking event for the first time in his 17-year career. He began the event by outplaying Judd Trump in a 5–1 win with breaks of 115 and 97. His second round match against Martin Gould went to the colours in the deciding frame with Gould missing the final blue, before Holt potted the blue and pink to triumph 5–4. He then swept past world number 100 Kyren Wilson 5–1 to face home favourite Xiao Guodong in the semi-finals. Holt was beaten 6–3 by Xiao in a high-quality encounter. His form continued into the following week's Zhangjiagang Open by winning six games to reach his third minor-ranking final where he lost 4–1 to Ju Reti. At the German Masters, Holt played Trump in the quarter-finals, with Trump exacting some revenge from his defeat earlier in the season by whitewashing Holt 5–0. Holt qualified for the World Championship, losing 10–4 to Mark Allen in the first round, but his successful season saw him finish it as the world number 22, the highest he had been in eight years.

2014–15 season

Holt began the 2014–15 season by advancing to the final of the Yixing Open, but he was beaten 4–2 by Ding Junhui. He eliminated Rory McLeod and Sam Baird at the Wuxi Classic, before losing 5–1 to Neil Robertson in the last 16. A second last 16 ranking event appearance followed at the Shanghai Masters after Holt overcame Ricky Walden 5–2, but he was ousted by reigning world champion Mark Selby 5–2. Holt made a 138 break during his 6–1 victory over Zak Surety in the opening round of the UK Championship, before losing 6–3 to Dechawat Poomjaeng. He lost his first six ranking matches in 2015, but qualified for the PTC Grand Final by finishing sixth on the Asian Order of Merit. There, Holt defeated Jimmy Robertson 4–2 and held on against Stephen Maguire to win 4–3 having been 3–0 up. In his only quarter-final in a ranking event this season, Holt was knocked out 4–1 by Joe Perry.

2015–16 season
The 2015–16 season was a solid but unspectacular year for Holt as he qualified for every ranking event he entered, but was unable to make a single quarter-final appearance. However, he did have a number of significant wins during the campaign. He reached the semi-finals of the minor-ranking Paul Hunter Classic by beating Judd Trump 4–1, but lost 4–2 to Ali Carter. Holt played Ronnie O'Sullivan in the opening round of the World Grand Prix and he made breaks of 88 and 119 in going 3–0 up. O'Sullivan responded to make it 3–3, before a 76 from Holt saw him advance to the second round, where he was knocked out 4–2 by Liang Wenbo. In the first round of the World Championship he scored his first win at the Crucible for 11 years by beating 2010 winner Neil Robertson 10–6. In the second round Holt lost 13–8 to Mark Williams, but hoped the defeat would be a turning point in his career and that next year he would arrive at the tournament as a ranking event winner.

2016–17 season
Holt almost delivered on this statement straight away as he reached the final of the Riga Masters, the first ranking event of the 2016–17 season. He got past reigning world champion Mark Selby 4–1 and then beat Ian Burns and Stuart Bingham both 4–3 and Anthony McGill 4–0. His semi-final with Mark Williams was decided on the final brown in a deciding frame. In his first ranking event final, he took a slender 2–1 lead over Neil Robertson, but was defeated 2–5. Holt beat Ronnie O'Sullivan for the second time in a row when he knocked him out 5–2 in the second round of the Shanghai Masters. He had a chance to force a deciding frame in the quarter-finals against Ding Junhui but a missed black off the spot saw him lose 3–5. Another win over O'Sullivan came in the third round of the International Championship, before narrowly losing 5–6 to Stuart Bingham in the quarter-finals. Holt lost in the second round of the UK Championship, German Masters and China Open. He was one win away from qualifying for the World Championship when his tie with Peter Ebdon went to a final-frame decider. Holt went in-off on the final blue and Ebdon potted the final three balls to win 10–9.

2019–20 season
In February 2020, Holt won the Snooker Shoot Out for his first ranking tournament win.

Personality
Holt has said that he finds it difficult to re-focus after playing a poor shot, leading to dips in form that may last for two to three frames.

Personal life
Holt stated during the 2016 World Championship that he regrets leaving school early and that he was studying for a business degree. He got married in June 2017 and now has a son, born in March 2018. Holt supports his local football club Nottingham Forest.

Performance and rankings timeline

Career finals

Ranking finals: 3 (1 title)

Minor-ranking finals: 4 (2 titles)

Non-ranking finals: 3 (1 title)

Pro-am finals: 8 (3 titles)

Team finals: 3 (3 titles)

Amateur finals: 1

References

External links

Michael Holt at worldsnooker.com

1978 births
Living people
English snooker players
Sportspeople from Nottingham
Competitors at the 2005 World Games